Cape Carteret is a town in Carteret County, on the southern coast of North Carolina,  United States. It was incorporated in 1959 and had a population of 2,224 as of the 2020 census.

Geography
Cape Carteret is located in western Carteret County at  (34.694478, -77.059129). It is bordered to the north by Petrified Creek and the Croatan National Forest; to the east by Bogue, and to the west by Cedar Point. To the south is Bogue Sound, with the town of Emerald Isle on the opposite shore, connected to Cape Carteret by the B. Cameron Langston Bridge carrying North Carolina Highway 58. NC 58 leads north  to U.S. Route 17 at Maysville. North Carolina Highway 24 leads east  to Morehead City and west  to Jacksonville.

Demographics

2020 census

As of the 2020 United States census, there were 2,224 people, 934 households, and 695 families residing in the town.

2000 census
As of the census of 2000, there were 1,214 people, 545 households, and 415 families residing in the town. The population density was 511.5 people per square mile (197.8/km2). There were 711 housing units at an average density of 299.6 per square mile (115.8/km2). The racial makeup of the town was 98.11% White, 0.33% African American, 0.16% Native American, 0.58% Asian, 0.08% Pacific Islander, 0.16% from other races, and 0.58% from two or more races. Hispanic or Latino of any race were 1.40% of the population.

There were 545 households, out of which 17.2% had children under the age of 18 living with them, 69.5% were married couples living together, 5.3% had a female householder with no husband present, and 23.7% were non-families. 21.1% of all households were made up of individuals, and 13.6% had someone living alone who was 65 years of age or older. The average household size was 2.23 and the average family size was 2.51.

In the town, the population was spread out, with 14.7% under the age of 18, 3.7% from 18 to 24, 18.5% from 25 to 44, 29.7% from 45 to 64, and 33.4% who were 65 years of age or older. The median age was 54 years. For every 100 females, there were 96.1 males. For every 100 females age 18 and over, there were 93.3 males.

The median income for a household in the town was $44,514, and the median income for a family was $49,722. Males had a median income of $30,542 versus $25,000 for females. The per capita income for the town was $26,806. About 2.6% of families and 5.0% of the population were below the poverty line, including 12.6% of those under age 18 and 3.1% of those age 65 or over.

References

External links

Town of Cape Carteret official website

Towns in North Carolina
Towns in Carteret County, North Carolina
Populated places established in 1959
1959 establishments in North Carolina